The term Congolese music can refer to the music of two countries:
Music of the Republic of the Congo (Congo-Brazzaville)
Music of the Democratic Republic of the Congo (Zaire, Congo-Kinshasa)

In addition, the term Congo music can refer to at least two styles
In English-speaking West African countries (e.g. Nigeria, Ghana, Liberia), Congo music refers to the genre more commonly known as soukous, which is widely performed in both Congos, though is more closely associated with the Democratic Republic of the Congo.
In Panama and Colombia, there is an Afro-Caribbean genre of music called Congo music